Salvita Decorte (born 13 July 1990) is an Indonesian actress and model.

Career 
Decorte was born in Bali to an Indian/Indonesian father and a German mother. She started a career as a model at the age of 15 years, becoming a brand ambassador for Volcom in 2012. In addition, Salvita also inherited a love of art from her parents who were both painters; she specializes in abstract paintings.

Salvita's career as an actress began in 2014 with a supporting role in the film Mantan Terindah. She won the lead role in Lily: Bunga Terakhirku  co-starring Baim Wong. Besides the big screen, Salvita has a starring role in season 1 of the HBO series Halfworlds.

Filmography

Film

Television

External links 
 Salvita Decorte on Twitter
 Salvita Decorte on Facebook
 Salvita Decorte on WorldCat (libraries)

References 

1987 births
Living people
Indonesian actors
People from Bali